Coldwater Township may refer to the following places in the United States:

 Coldwater Township, Butler County, Iowa
 Coldwater Township, Comanche County, Kansas
 Coldwater Township, Branch County, Michigan
 Coldwater Township, Isabella County, Michigan

Township name disambiguation pages